The species name ingrata (Latin for "offensive") is a common element in taxonomic names. Examples include:

Fungi:
 Clavulina ingrata, a species of coral fungus found in Malaysia
 Hygrocybe ingrata, a species of waxcap mushroom found in Europe

Insects:
 Caloptilia ingrata, a species of insect known from Tanzania
 Endothenia ingrata, a species of moth in the genus Endothenia
 Eupithecia ingrata, a synonym of Eupithecia nigrilinea, a species of moth found in central Asia
 Stemmatophora ingrata, a synonym of Hypotia proximalis, a species of snout moth found in Azerbaijan and Pakistan
 Terias ingrata, a synonym of Eurema boisduvaliana, a species of butterfly found from Costa Rica to Mexico
 Trychosis ingrata, a species of wasp found in much of Europe

Plants:
 Acacia ingrata, a species of shrub native to Western Australia
 Michelia ingrata, a species of plant endemic to China
 Myristica Ingrata, a species of tree in the genus Myristica found in Asia and the western Pacific

Taxonomic lists